Tsa or Dza (majuscule: Ծ; minuscule: ծ; Armenian: ծա) is the fourteenth letter of the Armenian alphabet, representing the voiceless alveolar affricate in Eastern Armenian and the voiced alveolar affricate in Western Armenian. It is typically romanized with the digraph Ts. It was part of the alphabet created by Mesrop Mashtots in the 5th century CE. In the Armenian numeral system, it has a value of 50.

Character codes

See also
 Xe, the letter preceding Tsa in the Armenian alphabet
 Armenian alphabet

References

External links
 Ծ on Wiktionary
 ծ on Wiktionary

Armenian letters
Armenian alphabet
Armenian language